Simon Okwi is a Ugandan professional footballer who plays as a forward for Victoria University SC.

International career
In January 2014, coach Milutin Sedrojevic, invited him to be included in the Uganda national football team for the 2014 African Nations Championship. The team placed third in the group stage of the competition after beating Burkina Faso, drawing with Zimbabwe and losing to Morocco.

References

Living people
Uganda A' international footballers
2014 African Nations Championship players
Ugandan footballers
SC Victoria University players
1993 births

Association football forwards
Uganda international footballers